Edwin Jacobs (14 March 1853 – 26 April 1901) was a New Zealand cricketer. He played in one first-class match for Wellington in 1873/74.

See also
 List of Wellington representative cricketers

References

External links
 

1853 births
1901 deaths
New Zealand cricketers
Wellington cricketers
People from Croydon